Vishva is an alternative name for Vishnu, which refers to the world, the universe. Vishva or Visva may also refer to
Jain Vishva Bharati University in Rajasthan, India
Visva-Bharati University in West Bengal, India
Vishva Hindu Parishad, an Indian right-wing Hindu nationalist organisation
Vishva (name)